Mal Waldron on Steinway is an album by American jazz pianist Mal Waldron featuring solo performances recorded in Paris in 1972 and released on the Japanese Teichiku label.

Reception 
The Allmusic review by Thom Jurek awarded the album 3½ stars, stating: "The pieces here are not Waldron's most adventurous, but that's just fine, because what's on offer is delightful... this is a fine and curious date; it showcases the pianist using the Steinway as a compositional element in his tunes and puts a different side of his mercurial musical personality on display."

Track listing
 "Portrait of a Bullfighter" – 7:26
 "One for Bud" – 6:19
 "For Erik Satie" – 6:34
 "Paris Reunited" – 18:38

All compositions by Mal Waldron.

Recorded in Paris, France, on May 11, 1972.

Personnel 
 Mal Waldron – piano

References 

Teichiku Records albums
Mal Waldron albums
1973 albums
Solo piano jazz albums